The Minister of State Administration is a senior member of the Constitutional Government of East Timor heading the Ministry of State Administration.

Functions
Under the Constitution of East Timor, the Minister has the power and the duty:

Where the Minister is in charge of the subject matter of a government statute, the Minister is also required, together with the Prime Minister, to sign the statute.

Incumbent
The incumbent Minister of State Administration is Miguel Pereira de Carvalho. He is assisted by Lino de Jesus Torrezão, Deputy Minister of State Administration.

List of Ministers 
The following individuals have been appointed as the Minister:

References

Footnote

Notes

External links
  – official site

State Administration